La Bouche de Jean-Pierre is a 1996 French drama film directed by Lucile Hadžihalilović. It was screened in the Un Certain Regard section at the 1996 Cannes Film Festival.

Cast
 Denise Aron-Schropfer as Solange
 Sandra Sammartino as Mimi
 Michel Trillot as Jean-Pierre

Production
In reference to the living room scene, Sandra Sammartino said,"No one has ever spoken to me brutally saying 'this is a touching scene, you are facing a pedophile, it will be hard'! That's why I had no apprehension, some embarrassment to be sure but for me it was all just a game !! I had a lot of fun on the set and I got along very well with Michel, I was able to distinguish between him and Jean Pierre... But I remember thinking to myself, 'This Jean Pierre is really stupid, why he does that ? !' Because in my young mind this kind of character did not exist in reality. Surely I would have had more trouble if I had been old enough to understand what I was shooting."

References

External links

1996 short films
1996 films
1990s French-language films
1996 drama films
French drama short films
Films directed by Lucile Hadžihalilović
1990s French films